Hansruedi Schafroth (born 9 September 1934) is a Swiss former sports shooter. He competed in the 50 metre rifle, prone event at the 1968 Summer Olympics.

References

External links
 

1934 births
Living people
Swiss male sport shooters
Olympic shooters of Switzerland
Shooters at the 1968 Summer Olympics
Sportspeople from the canton of Bern